is a Japanese professional footballer who plays for Veikkausliiga club  HJK Helsinki.

He was a participant at 2007 FIFA U-20 World Cup in Canada and scored 1 goal in 3 appearances.

Club career
Tanaka was educated at and played for Maebashi Ikuei High School in Gunma. While he was a high school student, he was chosen as one of the Designated Players for Development by J.League and JFA. Because of this status, He was able to register as an Albirex Niigata player while he was still eligible to play for his high school club. He played two league games for Albirex in the 2005 season. He made his debut on 27 November 2005 in a J1 League away match against Nagoya Grampus Eight.

After graduating from his high school in 2006, he officially signed with Albirex Niigata. His first appearance as a professional player came on 5 March 2006 in a league match against Kawasaki Frontale. His first professional goal came on 8 April 2006 in a league match against Ventforet Kofu.

After scoring once in five matches for his new team HJK Helsinki in the 2015 Finnish League Cup, he scored on his Veikkausliiga debut against RoPS in a 3–1 away win on 12 April.

In October 2015 of the same year, HJK exercised their option of keeping Tanaka under contract for the 2016 season.

Tanaka was voted as a best eleven member in 2015 and 2016 in the Finnish League.

On 25 October 2017, it was announced that Tanaka would leave HJK at the end of the 2017 season.

He is playing for Cerezo Osaka for the 2018 season.

On 3 March 2020, Tanaka returned to Helsingin Jalkapalloklubi, signing a contract until the end of July.

International career
Tanaka was a U-20 international and took part in the 2006 AFC Youth Championship and 2007 U-20 World Cup. He scored 1 goal in 8 appearances for this tournament.

Career statistics

Honours

Individual
Veikkausliiga Team of the Year: 2016

Notes

References

External links
Profile at Cerezo Osaka

1987 births
Living people
Association football people from Niigata Prefecture
Japanese footballers
Japan youth international footballers
J1 League players
Albirex Niigata players
Veikkausliiga players
Helsingin Jalkapalloklubi players
Cerezo Osaka players
Japanese expatriate footballers
Expatriate footballers in Finland
Japanese expatriate sportspeople in Finland
Association football midfielders